Ralph Phillips (9 August 1933 – September 2011) was an English footballer who made 112 appearances in the Football League playing as a full back for Northampton Town and Darlington in the 1950s and 1960s. He began his senior career with Middlesbrough, without representing them in the League.

References

1933 births
2011 deaths
People from Hetton-le-Hole
Footballers from Tyne and Wear
English footballers
Association football defenders
Middlesbrough F.C. players
Northampton Town F.C. players
Darlington F.C. players
English Football League players